TM2 or Tm2 may refer to:

 Soyuz TM-2, the spacecraft used to launch a long duration crew to the Soviet space station Mir
 Thermal Monitor 2, a computer central processing unit thermal control
 TM2, a Rolls-Royce Marine Olympus gas turbine
 Square terametre (Tm2), a multiple of the SI unit of surface area, the square metre
 Tm^2, a metric unit equal to a weber

See also
 5857 Neglinka (1975 TM2), a main-belt asteroid